John Wang or John Baptist Wang may refer to:

Roman Catholic bishops
John Baptist Wang Jin (1924–2014), Chinese Roman Catholic bishop in Shanxi
John Wang Ruowang (born 1962), Chinese Roman Catholic bishop in Gansu
John Baptist Wang Xiaoxun (born 1966), Chinese Roman Catholic bishop in Shaanxi
John Wang Renlei (born 1970), Chinese Roman Catholic bishop in Xuzhou

Other people
John Wang (politician) (born 1962), Taiwanese politician
Wang Lung-wei (born 1947), also known as Johnny Wang, Chinese actor